Velykyi Mydsk is a village in Rivne Raion, Rivne Oblast, Ukraine, but was formerly administered within Kostopil Raion. As of the year 2001, the community had 911 residents. The postal code is 35012, and the KOATUU code is 5623480401.

The first information about Michesk belong to 1150 year. Under the name of Medsko a village is known from 1577 year.

References

External links 
 Article Monasteryszcze in the Geographical Dictionary of the Kingdom of Poland, Volume VI (Malczyce — Netreba), 1885 year 

Villages in Rivne Raion